The following list consists of countries and territories that have sent a delegate to the Mister World male pageant. 7 of the current delegations have won at least once in history, since the first edition in 1996.

List 
This list contains countries and territories that have sent a delegate to the pageant at least once since 1996.

Notes
 Bolivia, Brazil, Mexico, Philippines, Puerto Rico, and Spain have participated in all 10 editions.
 As of the last edition in 2019, no country have won the Mister World title twice.
 As of 2019, 122 countries, or territories, has joined the pageant.
 50 countries debuted in the first edition in 1996; 6 in 1998; 5 in 2000; 9 in 2003; 12 in 2007; 17 in 2010; 1 in 2012; 3 in 2014, 3 in 2016 and 16 in 2019.
 57 countries have entered the Mister World pageant at least once, but never placed.

See also
 Mister World
 Mister World country rankings

References
Mister World country participation lists - Pageantopolis.com

External links
Official Mister World website - www.mrworld.tv

Countries
Mister World